Harry's House is a 2022 studio album by Harry Styles.

Harry's House may also refer to:
 "Harry's House / Centerpiece", a song by Joni Mitchell from the 1975 album The Hissing of Summer Lawns
 Harry's House, a recording studio in Boulder, Colorado owned by Fast Speaking Music

See also
 Harry House (1919–2006), Australian rules footballer
 
 Harris House (disambiguation)